Zhu Lin (born 29 October 1984) is a badminton player from Shanghai, China. She is 2007 world champion in women's singles. Zhu graduated from the Tongji University in the marketing department. She also won the women's singles gold medal at the 2009 Asia Championships.

Achievements

BWF World Championships 
Women's singles

Asian Championships 
Women's singles

Asian Junior Championships 
Girls' singles

BWF Superseries 
The BWF Superseries, launched on 14 December 2006 and implemented in 2007, is a series of elite badminton tournaments sanctioned by the Badminton World Federation (BWF). BWF Superseries has two levels, the Superseries and Superseries Premier. A season of Superseries features twelve tournaments around the world, which was introduced 2011, with successful players invited to the Superseries Finals held at the year's end.

Women's singles

  BWF Superseries Finals tournament
  BWF Superseries Premier tournament
  BWF Superseries tournament

BWF Grand Prix 
The BWF Grand Prix has two levels, the Grand Prix and Grand Prix Gold. It is a series of badminton tournaments sanctioned by the Badminton World Federation (BWF) since 2007. The World Badminton Grand Prix has been sanctioned by the International Badminton Federation (IBF) from 1983 to 2006.

Women's singles

  BWF Grand Prix Gold tournament
  BWF & IBF Grand Prix tournament

IBF International 
Women's singles

Record against selected opponents 
Record against year-end Finals finalists, World Championships semi-finalists, and Olympic quarter-finalists.

References

External links 
 BWF profile

1984 births
Living people
Badminton players from Shanghai
Chinese female badminton players
Badminton players at the 2006 Asian Games
Asian Games gold medalists for China
Asian Games medalists in badminton
Medalists at the 2006 Asian Games
World No. 1 badminton players